Hello Goodbye is a Dutch airport reality television show produced by the Dutch broadcaster NCRV for Nederland 1 and hosted by Joris Linssen. The format has been picked up and remade in other countries.

Format
The show involves the presenter, roaming around the airport (Amsterdam Airport Schiphol in the Dutch series, London Heathrow Airport in the British series and Toronto Pearson International Airport in the Canadian series) with a camera man asking members of the public in departures and arrivals who they are saying goodbye to at the airport, or welcoming home. The presenter looks for unusual stories and the show is edited with inspirational music in dramatic points of the show, usually when people say their goodbyes or meet who they have been waiting for.

International versions 
A British version of the show was commissioned for six episodes broadcast over six weeks.

References

Dutch reality television series
Aviation television series
NPO 1 original programming